Headin' Down Into the Mystery Below is an album by American musician John Hartford, released in 1978. All the songs, written by Hartford, continue to show his love for steamboats and the Mississippi River. It is currently not in print.

Track listing
All tracks composed by John Hartford
"The Mississippi Queen" – 3:30
"Mama Plays the Calliope" – 2:45
"See the Julia Belle Swain" – 2:30
"On Christmas Eve" – 3:20
"Natchez Whistle" – 2:55
"Kentucky Pool" – 2:30
"Miss Ferris" – 7:00
"Paducah" – 2:10
"Headin' Down into the Mystery" – 5:30
"Beatty's Navy" – 1:12
"In Plain View of the Town" – 2:30

Personnel
John Hartford – banjo, guitar, fiddle, plywood, vocals
Jack Greene – vocals
Billy Ray Reynolds – vocals
Jeannie Seely – vocals
Lisa Silver – vocals
Diane Tidwell – vocals

Production
Produced by Michael Melford
Richard Adler – engineer

References

External links
LP Discography of John Hartford.

John Hartford albums
1978 albums